The 1937 Cleveland Rams season was the team's first year playing as a member club of the National Football League (NFL) and the second season based in Cleveland, Ohio.

Schedule

Standings

References
1937 Cleveland Rams Season at Pro-Football Reference

Cleveland Rams
Cleveland Rams seasons
Cleveland Rams